Hierrezuelo is a surname. Notable people with the surname include:

Caridad Hierrezuelo (1924–2009), Cuban singer
Lorenzo Hierrezuelo (1907–1993), Cuban singer and composer
Raydel Hierrezuelo (born 1987), Cuban volleyball player
Reinaldo Hierrezuelo, Cuban singer and guitarist